Marat Mahomedovych Daudov (born 3 August 1989) is a Ukrainian professional football midfielder.

Daudov began his playing career with FC Zorya Luhansk's youth and than double teams. Than he played on loan in FC Stal Alchevsk. Since 2008, he has contract with FC Helios Kharkiv.

References

External links 
 
 

1989 births
Footballers from Luhansk
Living people
Ukrainian footballers
Association football midfielders
FC Stal Alchevsk players
FC Helios Kharkiv players
FC Naftovyk-Ukrnafta Okhtyrka players
PFC Sumy players
FC Poltava players
FC Hirnyk-Sport Horishni Plavni players
FC Alashkert players
FC Ararat Yerevan players
FC Kramatorsk players
NK Veres Rivne players
FC Polissya Zhytomyr players
Ukrainian First League players
Ukrainian Second League players
Armenian Premier League players
Ukrainian expatriate footballers
Expatriate footballers in Armenia
Ukrainian expatriate sportspeople in Armenia